Mistaken Orders is a 1925 silent film action adventure directed by J. P. McGowan. It starred Helen Holmes and Henry A. Barrows.

Prints held by Library of Congress, Academy Film Archive and BFI National Film and Television Archive.

Cast
Helen Holmes - Helen Barton
Jack Perrin - Tom Lawson
Henry A. Barrows - General Barton 
Hal Walters - Vince Barton
Harry Tenbrook - Tony Sharkey
Cecil Kellogg - The Night Operator
Mack V. Wright - The Day Agent
Arthur Millett - Tom Lawson's Father
Alice Belcher - Jane Moriarty

References

External links

1925 films
American silent feature films
Films directed by J. P. McGowan
American black-and-white films
American action adventure films
1920s action adventure films
Rayart Pictures films
1920s American films
Silent action adventure films
1920s English-language films